Alastair Harold Kurt Smail (born 3 July 1964) is an English judge and former first-class cricketer.

Smail was born at Kingston upon Thames in July 1964. He later studied at Exeter College, Oxford. While studying at Oxford, he played first-class cricket for Oxford University in 1983, making six appearances. Playing as a left-arm medium pace bowler, he took 5 wickets at an average of 44.40 and best figures of 3 for 49. As a tailend batsman, he scored 24 runs with a high score of 13 not out.

A student of Gray's Inn, he was called to the bar in 1987. He was appointed to be an employment judge of the Employment Tribunals of England Wales by Jack Straw in 2009.

References

External links

1964 births
Living people
People from Kingston upon Thames
People educated at Hampton School
Alumni of Exeter College, Oxford
English cricketers
Oxford University cricketers
Members of Gray's Inn
English barristers
21st-century English judges